Isla Bastimentos National Marine Park (in Spanish: Parque Nacional Marino Isla Bastimentos) is a marine park located in the Bocas del Toro Archipelago, Panama. The park covers 13,226 hectares.

History 
The park has been managed and protected by the National Environmental Authority of Panama (ANAM) since its creation in 1988. The Cayos Zapatillas are the most popular place to visit this park.

Geography 
The site has an area of 13,000 hectares. It includes multiple islands including the Cayo Zapatilla Major and other minor islands.

Sights
The park protects forests, mangroves, monkeys, sloths, caiman, crocodile, and 28 species of amphibians and reptiles. Playa Larga (Long Beach), on Isla Bastimentos, that is important nesting site for sea turtles. Four species of endangered sea turtles use it as a nesting site from April through September. The rana rojo (strawberry poison-dart frog) also inhabits the island. It is home to over 250 species of fish and marine mammals.

The turtles mostly go to Playa Larga (Long Beach), which is located at the north side of the marine park.

The monkeys and sloths are seen at Quebrada de Sal (Salt Creek).

The park also has nearly eighty eighty different coral species. The corals are believed to be over 10,000 years old.

Wizard Beach. also known as Playa Primera, scenic yellow sand beach next to jungle reached by a wilderness path from Old Bank in dry weather. Further along the coast are Playa Segunda (Second Beach) and Red Frog Beach. There is also a water taxi to Red Frog Beach from a marina on the south side of the island.

See also
List of National Parks

References

National parks of Panama
Marine parks
Marine reserves
Bocas del Toro Province
Panamanian coasts of the Caribbean Sea